Enamorada (In love) is the eighth album by Mexican iconic pop singer Lucía Méndez. The album was released in 1983 and helped her to consolidate herself in Latin America with themes such as Enamorada, Amor Volcánico, Mi Amor, Amor, Margarita and Corazón de Fresa.

Track listing
 Mi Amor, Amor
 Márchate de Aquí
 Margarita 
 Amor a Dos
 Parte de Mí
 Enamorada
 Amor Volcánico
 Cobarde
 Corazón de Fresa 
 Súper Miedo

Singles
Mi Amor, Amor / Amor Volcánico
Enamorada / Super Miedo

Video Clips
Amor a Dos
Corazón de Fresa 
Cobarde
Márchate de Aquí
Parte de Mí
Margarita 
Amor Volcánico
Enamorada

External links 
Lucía Méndez Official Website

1983 albums
Lucía Méndez albums